was an  destroyer of the Imperial Japanese Navy. Her name means "Spring Moon". She was different from her other sisters, as she was built as a flagship for the Escort Fleet.

Design and description
The Akizuki-class ships were originally designed as anti-aircraft escorts for carrier battle groups, but were modified with torpedo tubes and depth charges to meet the need for more general-purpose destroyer. Her crew numbered 300 officers and enlisted men.

The ship had two Kampon geared steam turbines, each driving one propeller shaft, using steam provided by three Kampon water-tube boilers.

The main armament of the Akizuki class consisted of eight Type 98  dual purpose guns in four twin-gun turrets, two superfiring pairs fore and aft of the superstructure. They carried four Type 96  anti-aircraft guns in two twin-gun mounts. The ships were also armed with four  torpedo tubes in a single quadruple traversing mount; one reload was carried for each tube. Their anti-submarine weapons comprised six depth charge throwers for which 72 depth charges were carried.

Construction and career
On 5 October 1945, Harutsuki was removed from Navy List. On 28 August 1947, she was turned over to the Soviet Union, renamed Vnezapny (Внезапный) and rearmed with eight  guns, fifteen 25 mm guns and four  torpedo tubes. She became the training ship Oskol in 1949, target ship TsL-64 in 1955 and finally floating barracks PKZ-37, scrapped in 1969.

Notes

References

External links
 CombinedFleet.com: Akizuki-class destroyers
 CombinedFleet.com: Haruzuki history

Akizuki-class destroyers (1942)
World War II destroyers of Japan
1944 ships